The plant species Musa ingens, also known as the giant highland banana, is the physically largest member of the family Musaceae and the only member of the section Ingentimusa.

Description
Since its discovery in 1954, though, taller individuals up to  have been reported, but these measurements have yet to be confirmed by a specific scientific study. Its fruit grows in a cluster weighing up to 60 kg (132 lb). The large inflorescence can hold over 300 oblong fruits to 18 cm long that are filled with blackish-brown seeds and yellowish pulp that is edible, sweet, and delicious when cooked, and according to some, reminiscent of fine butternut squash mixed with a sweet banana with a dash of tangy lime and citrus added.

References

External links
 
http://www.users.globalnet.co.uk/~drc/musa_ingens.htm
 "Musa Ingens - The Tallest Banana Plant in the World"

ingens
Endemic flora of New Guinea